Oleg Skopintsev (born 15 April 1984) is a Russian handball player for Motor Zaporizhzhia and the Russian national team.

References

1984 births
Living people
Russian male handball players
Sportspeople from Krasnodar
HC Motor Zaporizhia players